Radio stations in United States have evolved since their early twentieth century origins. In 1920 8MK started operations in Detroit; after it, thousands of private and public radio have operated in the United States. The lists of radio stations in the US are organized in a number of ways; some of them are the following:

Stations by State

 List of radio stations in Alabama
 List of radio stations in Alaska
 List of radio stations in Arizona
 List of radio stations in Arkansas
 List of radio stations in California
 List of radio stations in Colorado
 List of radio stations in Connecticut
 List of radio stations in Delaware
 List of radio stations in Florida
 List of radio stations in Georgia (U.S. state)
 List of radio stations in Hawaii
 List of radio stations in Idaho
 List of radio stations in Illinois
 List of radio stations in Indiana
 List of radio stations in Iowa
 List of radio stations in Kansas
 List of radio stations in Kentucky
 List of radio stations in Louisiana
 List of radio stations in Maine
 List of radio stations in Maryland
 List of radio stations in Massachusetts
 List of radio stations in Michigan
 List of radio stations in Minnesota
 List of radio stations in Mississippi
 List of radio stations in Missouri
 List of radio stations in Montana
 List of radio stations in Nebraska
 List of radio stations in Nevada
 List of radio stations in New Hampshire
 List of radio stations in New Jersey
 List of radio stations in New Mexico
 List of radio stations in New York
 List of radio stations in North Carolina
 List of radio stations in North Dakota
 List of radio stations in Ohio
 List of radio stations in Oklahoma
 List of radio stations in Oregon
 List of radio stations in Pennsylvania
 List of radio stations in Rhode Island
 List of radio stations in South Carolina
 List of radio stations in South Dakota
 List of radio stations in Tennessee
 List of radio stations in Texas
 List of radio stations in Utah
 List of radio stations in Vermont
 List of radio stations in Virginia
 List of radio stations in Washington
 List of radio stations in Washington, D.C.
 List of radio stations in West Virginia
 List of radio stations in Wisconsin
 List of radio stations in Wyoming
 List of radio stations in U.S. Territories

Notes:

Stations in the United States by call sign

 List of AM radio stations in the United States by call sign (initial letters KA–KF)
 List of AM radio stations in the United States by call sign (initial letters KG–KM)
 List of AM radio stations in the United States by call sign (initial letters KN–KS)
 List of AM radio stations in the United States by call sign (initial letters KT–KZ)
 List of AM radio stations in the United States by call sign (initial letters WA–WF)
 List of AM radio stations in the United States by call sign (initial letters WG–WM)
 List of AM radio stations in the United States by call sign (initial letters WN–WS)
 List of AM radio stations in the United States by call sign (initial letters WT–WZ)
 List of FM radio stations in the United States by call sign (initial letters KA–KC)
 List of FM radio stations in the United States by call sign (initial letters KD–KF)
 List of FM radio stations in the United States by call sign (initial letters KG–KJ)
 List of FM radio stations in the United States by call sign (initial letters KK–KM)
 List of FM radio stations in the United States by call sign (initial letters KN–KP)
 List of FM radio stations in the United States by call sign (initial letters KQ–KS)
 List of FM radio stations in the United States by call sign (initial letters KT–KV)
 List of FM radio stations in the United States by call sign (initial letters KW–KZ)
 List of FM radio stations in the United States by call sign (initial letters WA–WC)
 List of FM radio stations in the United States by call sign (initial letters WD–WF)
 List of FM radio stations in the United States by call sign (initial letters WG–WJ)
 List of FM radio stations in the United States by call sign (initial letters WK–WM)
 List of FM radio stations in the United States by call sign (initial letters WN–WP)
 List of FM radio stations in the United States by call sign (initial letters WQ–WS)
 List of FM radio stations in the United States by call sign (initial letters WT–WV)
 List of FM radio stations in the United States by call sign (initial letters WW–WZ)

Other lists

 List of NPR stations
 List of United States radio networks
 List of community radio stations in the United States
 List of FM broadcast translators used as primary stations
 List of radio stations in North America by media market
 List of radio stations owned by Townsquare Media
 List of United States Coast Guard radio stations
 List of non-profit radio stations in the United States
 List of Pacifica Radio stations and affiliates
 List of American shortwave broadcasters
 Shortwave broadcasting in the United States
 List of campus radio stations in the United States
 List of jazz radio stations in the United States
 Channel 6 radio stations in the United States
 List of radio stations owned by Cumulus Media
 List of Air1 stations
 List of 50 kW AM radio stations in the United States
 List of Spanish Broadcasting System radio stations
 List of unlicensed high school radio stations
 AM Stereo and Digital AM in and near the United States
 List of AM-band radio station lists issued by the United States government

References
Abridged from U.S. State Department IIP publications and other U.S. government materials.

See also

 Radio in the United States
 Media of the United States
 List of radio stations in Canada